The 1898 British Columbia general election was held in 1898. It was held to elect members of the Legislative Assembly of British Columbia.

Unlike in the previous BC general election, in 1898 of the 38 MLAs 24 were elected in single member districts. There were also three 2-member districts and two 4-member districts. Each voter could cast as many votes as there were seats to fill in the district.

Party politics

There were no political parties in this election — until the 1903 election, British Columbia politics were officially non-partisan and political parties were not part of the process.  This trend began to change in the 1898 and 1900 elections with the appearance of party-designated candidates and some party-declared members; for example, Ralph Smith in South Nanaimo.  The political alignments designated at the time of the dropping of the writ did not necessarily have anything to do with the jockeying for power and support once the election returns were in.  Therefore, members shown as "Government" or "Opposition" only ran under that slate and had no necessary allegiances or party loyalties to follow.  If a new government formed from the "Opposition" slate, as here with Charles Augustus Semlin, there was  nothing to say that someone who'd run under the "Government" banner might not cross the floor either to join the governing caucus, or actually be invited over to take a cabinet position.

In the table below, the seating is only as it was when the House convened.  The failure of Semlin's government fell on the shoulders of an over-ambitious Joseph Martin by early 1900.  He held on to power despite a petition from Members of the House to the Lieutenant-Governor, but the Lieutenant-Governor, Thomas Robert McInnes, continued to support Martin so long as there was no sitting of the House, such that a situation of non-confidence could be proven, even though Martin had only himself and one other member in his caucus.  Martin held out for six months, but the inevitable sitting of the House and immediate vote of non-confidence and subsequent election removed him from power and brought in James Dunsmuir.

It was because of this debacle, born in this election and the ones that preceded it, that party politics was finally introduced to British Columbia for the 1903 election.

Results by riding 

|-
||    
|align="center"|Charles William Digby Clifford
|align="center"  rowspan=2|CassiarGovernment
||    
||    
|align="center"  |AlberniOpposition
|align="center"|Alan Webster Neill
||    
|-
||    
|align="center"|John Irving
||    
||    
|align="center"  rowspan=2|CaribooOpposition 
|align="center"|Hans Lars Helgesen
||    
|-
||    
|align="center"|James Dunsmuir
|align="center"  |ComoxGovernment
||    
||    
|align="center"|John Charlton Kinchant 
||    
|-
||    
|align="center"|Charles Edward Pooley
|align="center"  |EsquimaltOpposition
||    
||    
|align="center"  |EsquimaltOpposition
|align="center"|David Williams Higgins
||    
|-
||    
|align="center"|William Russell Robertson
|align="center"  |CowichanGovernment
||    
||    
|align="center"  |Lillooet EastOpposition
|align="center"|James Douglas Prentice
||    
|-
||    
|align="center"|William George Nielson
|align="center"  |East Kootenay (north riding)Government
||    
||    
|align="center"  |Nanaimo CityOpposition
|align="center"|Robert Edward McKechnie
||    
|-
||    
|align="center"|James Baker
|align="center"  |East Kootenay (south riding)Government
||    
||    
|align="center"  |South NanaimoLabour
|align="center"|Ralph Smith
||    
|-
||    
|align="center"|Alfred Wellington Smith
|align="center"  |Lillooet WestGovernment
||    
||    
|align="center" rowspan=4 |Vancouver CityOpposition
|align="center"|Francis Lovett Carter-Cotton
||    
|-
||    
|align="center"|Alexander Henderson
|align="center"  |New Westminster CityGovernment
||    
||    
|align="center"|Robert Macpherson
||    
|-
||    
|align="center"|John Bryden
|align="center"  |North NanaimoGovernment
||    
||    
|align="center"|Joseph Martin
||    
|-
||    
|align="center"|John Paton Booth
|align="center"  |North VictoriaGovernment
||    
||    
|align="center"|Charles Edward Tisdall
||    
|-
||    
|align="center"|David McEwen Eberts
|align="center"  |South VictoriaGovernment
||    
||    
|align="center"  |West Kootenay-NelsonOpposition
|align="center"|John Frederick Hume
||    
|-
||    
|align="center"|Richard Hall
|align="center" rowspan=4 |Victoria CityGovernment
||    
||    
|align="center"  |West Kootenay-RevelstokeOpposition
|align="center"|James M. Kellie
||    
|-
||    
|align="center"|Henry Dallas Helmcken
||    
||    
|align="center"  |West Kootenay-RosslandOpposition
|align="center"|James Morris Martin
||    
|-
||    
|align="center"|Albert Edward McPhillips
||    
||    
|align="center"  |West Kootenay-SlocanOpposition
|align="center"|Robert Francis Green
||    
|-
||    
|align="center"|John Herbert Turner1
||    
||    
|align="center"  |Westminster-ChilliwhackOpposition
|align="center"|Charles William Munro
||    
|-
||    
|align="center"|Richard McBride
|align="center"  |Westminster-DewdneyGovernment
||    
||    
|align="center"  |Westminster-DeltaOpposition
|align="center"|Thomas William Forster
||    
|-
||    
|align="center"|Price Ellison
|align="center"  |Yale-EastGovernment
||    
||    
|align="center"  |Westminster-RichmondOpposition
|align="center"|Thomas Kidd
||    
|-
|
|
|
|
||    
|align="center"  |Yale-NorthOpposition
|align="center"|Francis John Deane
||    
|-
|
|
|
|
||    
|align="center"  |Yale-WestOpposition
|align="center"|Charles Augustus Semlin2
||    
|-
|
|align-left"|1 Incumbent Premier
|
|
|
|
|align-left"|2 Premier-Elect
|-
| align="center" colspan="10"|Source: Elections BC
|-
|}

References

In the Sea of Sterile Mountains: The Chinese in British Columbia, Joseph Morton, J.J. Douglas, Vancouver (1974).  Despite its title, a fairly thorough account of the politicians and electoral politics in early BCE.

1898
1898 elections in Canada
1898 in British Columbia